Tommy Robredo was the defending champion but chose not to defend his title.

Frances Tiafoe won the title after defeating Salvatore Caruso 6–3, 3–6, 6–4 in the final.

Seeds

Draw

Finals

Top half

Bottom half

References

External links
Main draw
Qualifying draw

Internazionali di Tennis Emilia Romagna - Singles
Emilia-Romagna Open